Selective Employment Tax (SET) was a weekly payroll tax in the United Kingdom.

SET was intended to subsidise manufacturing industry from the proceeds of the services industries, to help exports. At the end of each accounting period, manufacturing companies would have their SET payments refunded, along with a 7s 6d bounty or premium per employee (SEP).  The premium was withdrawn outside assisted areas (United Kingdom) in 1967, while a Regional Employment Premium was introduced payable at fixed amounts for employees still eligible for SEP.

SET was designed to be a tax on those companies that did not boost UK exports. High-street bookmakers used the introduction of this tax as a reason to reduce the payout on some each-way bets (where a horse is placed in the first two or three, depending on the number of runners) from a quarter the odds to a fifth the odds. However, the previous, larger payouts were never restored when the tax ended.

This tax was introduced during the first Wilson ministry in 1966, by means of the Selective Employment Payments Act 1966. It was dropped in favour of the introduction of VAT by the Heath ministry of 1970–1974. Regional Employment Premiums were withdrawn as part of the response to the 1976 sterling crisis.

References

External links
 Selective Employment Payments Act 1966

Taxation in the United Kingdom
1966 establishments in the United Kingdom
Manufacturing in the United Kingdom